Qigang Chen (born 8 August 1951) is a Chinese-French composer who has lived in France since 1984 and obtained French citizenship in 1992.

Biography
Coming from an intellectual family, Qigang Chen was born in Shanghai and began his musical studies as a child. In his early teens, he was confronted with the Cultural Revolution and would spend three years locked up in a barracks, undergoing an "ideological reeducation". Nonetheless, his passion for music remained unshakeable and, in spite of the social pressure and anti-cultural policy, he pursued his training in composition.

In 1977, Chen was one of 26 candidates out of 2,000 to be accepted into the composition class at the Beijing Central Conservatory. After five years of studies with Luo Zhongrong, in 1983 he stood for the national competition where he came first. As a result, he was the only one in his field to be authorized to go abroad to pursue graduate studies in composition.

He was Olivier Messiaen's last student and lived with him as well, from 1984 to 1988. His first five years in France allowed him to broaden the scope of his culture and acquire new knowledge about 20th century music.

Reception 
Chen is one of the most performed living composers around the world, winning him many accolades. In 2001, his orchestral work Wu Xing was selected from over 1000 entries as one of the five finalists of the Masterprize Award, hosted by the BBC. In 2003, EMI/Virgin Classics released an album devoted to his music, including the highly acclaimed work Iris devoilée. It was later voted by Gramophone magazine as one of the Top Ten Classical Recordings of the Month. In 2005, he was awarded the Grand Prix de la Musique Symphonique by SACEM in recognition of his career achievement. He worked as Music Director of the Opening Ceremony of the 2008 Olympic Games in Beijing. Most recently, in 2013, he was decorated with Chevalier de l'Ordre des arts et des lettres by the French government.

In 2015, he launched a composition workshop at Gonggen College in China, as a platform for dialogues with, and between, young musicians.

List of works

Chamber
 Le Souvenir (1985) for flute and harp
 San Xiao (1995) for bamboo flute, san xian, zheng, and pipa
 Extase II (1997) for oboe and instrumental ensemble
 L'Éloignement (2003) for string orchestra
 Instants d'un opéra de Pékin (version from 2004) for piano solo
 Extase III (2010, arrangement of EXTASE) for oboe and traditional Chinese instrumental ensemble
 Voyage d'un rêve (new version from 2017) for flute, harp, percussion, and string trio
 La clarinette enchantée (2017) for flute, oboe, clarinet, basson, and French horn

Concerti
 Feu d'ombres (1990-1991) for soprano saxophone and small wind ensemble
 Extase (1995) for oboe and orchestra
 Reflet d'un temps disparu (1995-1996) for cello and orchestra
 La Nuit profonde (2001) for jinghu/jing erhu and orchestra
 Un Temps disparu (2002) for erhu and orchestra
 Er Huang (2009) for piano and orchestra
 Extase IV (2011, arrangement of Extase) for oboe and Chinese traditional orchestra
 Reflet d'un temps disparu II (2011, arrangement of Reflet d'un temps disparu) for cello and traditional Chinese orchestra
 Un Temps disparu II (2012) for viola and orchestra
 Joie eternelle (2013) for trumpet in C and orchestra
 La Joie de la souffrance (2017) for violin and orchestra

Vocal music
 Poème lyrique II (1990) for baritone and instrumental ensemble
 Invisible Voices (2005) for 6 mixed voices and large orchestra
 Jiang Tcheng Tse (2017) for solo voice, chorus, and orchestra

Orchestra
 Wu Xing (The Five Elements) (1998-1999) for symphony orchestra
 Iris dévoilée (Iris Unveiled, 2001) for large orchestra, three female voices, pipa, erhu and banhu, and zheng
 Enchantements oubliés (2004) for large string orchestra, harp, piano, celesta, and percussion
 Ouverture symphonique: "Instants d'un opéra de Pékin" (2014) for symphony orchestra
 Luan Tan (2010–2015) for orchestra
 Itinéraire d'une illusion (2017) for symphony orchestra

Electro-acoustic
 Rêve d'un solitaire (1992–1993) for instrumental ensemble or orchestra and electronics

Music for ballet
 Raise the Red Lantern (Épouses et concubines) (2000)

Songs
 You and Me (2008); theme song of 29th Olympic games in Beijing 2008
 Theme song of film Under the Hawthorn Tree (2010) for male voice
 Mother and childhood (2011) for male voice
 Invisible Forbidden City (2011) for male voice
 To meet again, in days gone by (2014) for male and female voice; theme song 2 for promotion of film "Coming Home"
 Following in your footsteps, till the end of the world (2014) for male voice; theme song 1 for promotion of film "Coming Home"
 Dream (2014) for female voice; theme song for subject-live performance at Dragon Tiger Mountain, Jiangxi

Music for open air project
 Music for the Opening Ceremony of the 29th Olympic Games (2008)

 Scroll Painting
 Ritual Music
 You and Me

Music for film
 "Under the Hawthorn Tree" (2010)
 "Flowers of War" (2011)
 "Coming Home" (2014)

Publishers
 Gérard Billaudot (Paris, from 1985 to 2007)
 Boosey & Hawkes (London, since 2008)
 Durand (for La Nuit profonde & Raise the Red Lantern)

General references
 BBC NOW/Zhang review – hypnotic, seductive stuff: Qigang Chen's beguiling score was conducted with love and care by Xian Zhang, who also brought grand passion to Rachmaninov's second symphony (Royal Albert Hall, London) https://www.theguardian.com/music/2015/jul/30/bbcnow-zhang-chen-premiere-prom-15
 Proms 2015: Prom 15, Prokofiev, Qigang Chen & Rachmaninov, review: 'beguiling' https://www.telegraph.co.uk/culture/music/proms/11770347/Proms-2015-Prom-15-Prokofiev-Qigang-Chen-and-Rachmaninov-review-beguiling.html
 Prom, 15, review: Qigang Chen's Iris devoilee shows an interesting way forward https://www.independent.co.uk/arts-entertainment/classical/reviews/prom-15-review-qigang-chens-iris-devoilee-shows-an-interesting-way-forward-10426743.html
 Prom 2: A tentative orchestra but a dazzling soloist https://bachtrack.com/review-proms-china-philharmonic-balsom-july-2014
 BBC Proms: China Philharmonic, review: a triumph of programming. The visit from the China Philharmonic to the Proms was full of shrewd choices says Ivan Hewett https://www.telegraph.co.uk/culture/music/proms/10979129/BBC-Proms-China-Philharmonic-review-a-triumph-of-programming.html
 Prom 2: China Philharmonic Orchestra/Yu review – a bit too cool https://www.theguardian.com/music/2014/jul/20/prom-2-china-philharmonic-orchestra-yu-review
 Memories of son inspire composer Chen Qigang to escape his creative abyss http://www.scmp.com/news/hong-kong/article/1767928/memories-son-inspire-composer-chen-qigang-escape-his-creative-abyss
 Konzert West-östliche Klangspiele: Long Yu dirigiert die Münchner Philharmoniker http://www.sueddeutsche.de/kultur/konzert-west-oestliche-klangspiele-1.3042458
 München/Die Münchner Philharmoniker – Qigang Chen – Gustav Mahler http://der-neue-merker.eu/muenchendie-muenchner-philharmoniker-qigang-chen-gustav-mahler
 The China NCPA Orchestra is (mostly) brilliant at Koerner Hall in Toronto http://news.nationalpost.com/arts/music/the-china-ncpa-orchestra-is-mostly-brilliant-at-koerner-hall-in-toronto
 Beijing orchestra makes impressive showing in Chicago debut http://chicagoclassicalreview.com/2014/11/beijing-orchestra-makes-impressive-showing-in-chicago-debut/
 China's National Centre for the Performing Arts Orchestra is four years old and on tour https://montrealgazette.com/entertainment/music/visiting-chinese-orchestra-gives-energetic-performance
Qigang Chen: Works http://www.chenqigang.com/works.php

External links
 Chen's website
 

1951 births
Chinese male composers
Living people
Chinese expatriates in France
Musicians from Shanghai
Chinese classical composers
EMI Classics and Virgin Classics artists
French ballet composers